Clio Channel is a marine waterway running southwest to northeast between Turnour and West Cracroft Islands in the Johnstone Strait region of the Central Coast of British Columbia, Canada.

Name origin

References

Straits of British Columbia
Central Coast of British Columbia